The United Evangelical Church in Angola separated from the Evangelical Reformed Church in Angola. Differences of opinion arose about the way of Archibald Patterson should be preserved, and there were tensions concerning the leadership of the church. Rev. Domingos Alexandre and several others decided to form a new denomination. It has 2,200 members in 11 congregations.

References

Protestantism in Angola
Calvinist and Reformed denominations